2013 Shinhwa Grand Tour: The Classic was the Asia-wide live concert tour of South Korean boy band Shinhwa in support of their eleventh studio album, The Classic, which was released on 16 May 2013.

The tour commenced with two prologue shows in Seoul on 16 and 17 March 2013, titled 2013 Shinhwa 15th Anniversary Concert: The Legend Continues, in celebration of the group's 15th anniversary on 24 March. The tour continues, at the conclusion of promotional activities in Korea for the album, with one show in Hong Kong, two in China, two in Taiwan and three in Japan in June, July; and concluded with two finale shows in Seoul, titled 2013 Shinhwa Grand Finale: The Classic in Seoul in August 2013. In total 12 shows in six cities and five countries.

Concerts

Seoul concerts
The concerts were first announced in January 2013, it was announced that the group is to resume their music activities as a group with the release of their eleventh studio album and 15th anniversary concert in March. On 30 January, information on ticketing and a teaser video were released. In celebration of the anniversary, the Shinhwa 15th Anniversary Photo Exhibition Contest was held in conjunction of the concerts. The exhibition included Shinhwa's memories and defining moments since their debut in 1998, as well as 15 memorable items submitted by fans, with each receiving a prize of an autographed copy of Shinhwa’s 11th album.

It was accompanied by a second teaser video, where the members reminisced on their 90s tacky fashion, performing as veteran idols, their fan club Shinhwa Changjo, the forecoming concert tour, and their 15-year friendship. The 25,000 tickets were sold out within five minutes of going on sale, by over 300,000 people who tried to buy the tickets, who caused the server of Interpark to continually shut down during the five minutes of sale. For the concert members donned new styling looks, with Andy in a 'Greek Prince' look; and Jun Jin and Hye-sung in different shades of blond hair.

The tickets for the two Grand Finale shows in Seoul, went on sell at 20:00 on 12 June 2013 at Interpak. The 27,000 tickets for the two concerts were again sold out within five minutes of going on sale with the server for the ticketing website crashing after seven minutes. Ahead of the final concert on 4 August, Shinhwa members held a press conference. They talked about their plans for solo activities for the remainder of the year, and the success of the 11th album and tour. The Grand Finale concerts also included parody videos by the members of 2012 film Nameless Gangster: Rules of the Time.

Asia tour
At the commencement of the Grand Tour, Shinhwa Company announced that a commemorative necklace of the group's 15th anniversary, named "Forever", will be on sale at each location, starting with the Hong Kong concerts. The design of the necklace is the same as the one worn by Kim Dong-wan and Jun Jin in the music video of "This Love". The group will donate portions of the proceeds to the city of the concert, as part of members' wish to return their fans' support.

The concert in Hong Kong marks the first time in their 15 years career, that they had performed in the city. The show was attended by 15,000 people and the group performed their hit songs such as "Only One", "Hey, Come On", "Perfect Man", "Wedding" and "Brand New"; as well as new tracks, "This Love" and "That′s Right", "New Me", "Acquainted Guy" and "Love Song", from their 2013 album The Classic.

Setlist

Tour dates

Personnel
 Vocals / dancer: Shinhwa
 Tour organizer: Shinhwa Company, Top Class Entertainment, Liveworks Company, TOP Media
 Tour promoter: CJ E&M (Seoul)

References

External links
 Shinhwa Company official homepage 
 Shinhwa Company official Japanese homepage 

Shinhwa
2013 concert tours
Shinhwa concert tours